Siege of Philippsburg may refer to:
Siege of Philippsburg (1644) by France during the Thirty Years' War
Siege of Philippsburg (1676) by the Holy Roman Empire during the Franco-Dutch War
Siege of Philippsburg (1688) by France during the Nine Years' War
Siege of Philippsburg (1734) by France during the War of the Polish Succession